The Lonchaeidae are a family of acalyptrate flies commonly known as lance flies. About 500 described species are placed into 9 genera. These are generally small but robustly built flies with blue-black or metallic bodies. They are found, mainly in wooded areas, throughout the world with the exception of polar regions and New Zealand.

Description
For terms see Morphology of Diptera.

The Lonchaeids are small flies with a black or blackish-blue body, which is often metallic, glossy, and with hyaline (lacking dark spots) wings. The head is hemispherical (shorter than high) and the lunule is well defined. The third antennal segment is usually elongated and the antennae are decumbent. Ocelli are present and the postocellar bristles are divergent. The frons is narrow in males; in females it is broad. One pair of orbital bristles is on the head. The postvertical bristles on the head are parallel or weakly divergent. Distinctive vibrissae on the head are lacking, but vibrissa-like bristles are present along the border of the mouth. A subapical bristle is absent on tibia. The wing venation is complete. The costa has two interruptions: near the humeral crossvein and before the subcostal vein. The subcostal vein varies in size. The anal vein of the wing is shortened.  The abdomen is oval and rather flat, and in females has a long, sclerotized ovipositor. The ovipositor is rather long and triangular.

This family is readily distinguished from the family Periscelididae by the entire subcostal vein, from the Sapromyzidae by the absence of preapical tibial bristles on at least the anterior and posterior tibia, and from Pallopteridae by the presence of a propleural bristle and the exposed frontal lunule.

The larva is amphipneustic (has only the anterior and posterior pairs of spiracles) slender tapering at the anterior, and smooth except for ventral creeping welts. The cephalopharyngeal skeleton of the larva consists of two stout untoothed mandibles, a dental sclerite, an elongate hypopharyngeal sclerite, a parastomal bar, and an anvil-shaped tentoropharyngeal sclerite. The anterior spiracles (prothoracic spiracles) each have five to ten papillae which are arranged in a fan shape. The posterior spiracles (on the anal segment) are placed on a raised, sclerotized posterior spiracular tubercle. Each spiracle has three oval, radially arranged slits and four groups of branched spiracular hairs.

The pupa is enclosed within a puparium.

Biology

The larvae are mostly phytophagous, feeding on already damaged plant tissues, although coprophagous, mycophagous, saprophagous, and predatory species are known. Larvae may be found under bark, in tunnels of bark beetles, in decomposing wood and other decomposing plant residue, and in dung. Larvae of some species cause formation of galls on plants (including cereals), while larvae of other species live in juicy fruits (figs, etc.). Flies are found on trunks of trees, logs, cut wood, leaves of shrubs, and in grass. Some species are agricultural pests. The polyphagous and oligophagous species of the family Tephritidae (also called fruit flies) and Lonchaeidae are the main pests of horticulture in the neotropical region. Also in the neotropics, Neosilba perezi (Romero & Ruppel), known as the cassava shoot fly, is a pest of cassava (Manihot esculenta Crantz). Dasiops passifloris McAlpine (Diptera: Lonchaeidae) infests the fruit of the corky-stemmed passion flower Passiflora pallida L. in the Americas. Species in the genus Earomyia are pests of fir and spruce trees, destroying the seeds and cones. The black fig-fly Silba adipata McAlpine is a pest of figs. Lonchaea chorea is synanthropic and may become a nuisance pest.

List of genera

A list of genera of Lonchaeidae with approximate number of extant species

Subfamily Dasiopinae
 Dasiops  (Sometimes misspelt Dasyops) 126 species
Subfamily Lonchaeinae
 Chaetolonchaea  7 species
 Earomyia  22 species
 Lamprolonchaea  (Sometimes misspelt Lamprolonchea) 19 species
 Lonchaea  209 species
 Neosilba  40 species
 Protearomyia  6 species
 Setisquamalonchaea  4 species
 Silba  89 species

Identification
Czerny, L. 1934. Lonchaeidae. In: Lindner, E. (Ed.). Die Fliegen der Paläarktischen Region 5, 43, 1-40.. Keys to Palaearctic species but now needs revision (in German).
Morge, G. (1963) Die Lonchaeidae und Pallopteridae Österreichs und der Angrenzenden Gebiete. 1. Teil: Die Lonchaeidae. Naturkundliches Jahrbuch der Stadt Linz 9: 123-313.
Morge,G. 1959, 1962. Monographie der palearktischen Lonchaeidae Beitr. z. Entom., vol. 2, pp. 1–92, 323-371, 909-945; vol. 12, pp. 381–434. 
Stackelberg, A. A. Family Lonchaeidae in Bei-Bienko, G. Ya, 1988 Keys to the insects of the European Part of the USSR Volume 5 (Diptera) Part 2 English edition. Keys to Palaearctic species but now needs revision.
Séguy, E. (1934) Diptères: Brachycères. II. Muscidae acalypterae, Scatophagidae. Paris: Éditions Faune de France 28.BibliothequeVirtuelleNumerique pdf
MacGowan, I. & Rotheray, G. (2008) British Lonchaeidae (Diptera, Cyclorrhapha, Acalyptratae). Royal Entomological Society of London Handbook 10(15).
K. G. V. Smith, 1989 An introduction to the immature stages of British Flies. Diptera Larvae, with notes on eggs, puparia and pupae. Handbooks for the Identification of British Insects Vol 10 Part 14. pdf download manual (two parts Main text and figures index)

Image gallery
Images from Diptera.info

Species lists
West Palaearctic including Russia
Australasian/Oceanian
Nearctic
Japan
World list

References
Genus descriptions
  - Family descriptions

External links
Lonchaeidae online - the primary site for up to date information on world Lonchaeidae

Diptera.info Images
Family Lonchaeidae at EOL Images
 Dedicated website
Wing venation

 
Brachycera families
Articles containing video clips